Holy Trinity Church is a Roman Catholic parish church in Newcastle-under-Lyme, Staffordshire, England. It was built between 1833 and 1834, and designed by its priest, Fr James Egan in the Gothic Revival style. While it was described as "the finest modern specimen of ornamental brickwork in the kingdom" when it was built, Nikolaus Pevsner described it as "a crazy effort in blue brick." It is a Grade II* listed building, located on London Road close to the Grosvenor Roundabout.

History

Foundation
After the Reformation, from the early 1700s the nearest place for Catholics to celebrate Mass was at Chesterton Hall, the house of the Macclesfield family. Later, in the early 1800s, Catholics went to a room in the Shakespeare Hotel, Brunswick Street, to celebrate Mass. The priest serving the local mission was Fr Louis Gerard. Around 1826, Fr Edward Daniel replaced Fr Gerard. In 1831, Fr James Egan took over the mission in Newcastle-under-Lyme. He had come from Ashley where he built the Chapel of Our Blessed Lady and St John the Baptist.

Construction
Fr James Egan would go on to design the church after being offered all the necessary bricks to build a permanent Catholic church by a local brick manufacturer. In 1833, construction work started. The front of the church is made of blue vitrified Staffordshire brick. On 13 May 1834, Bishop Thomas Walsh, the Vicar Apostolic of the Midland District opened the church. After the church's opening, it was described as "the finest modern specimen of ornamental brickwork in the kingdom"; however according to Historic England, "two Protestant preachers held a public meeting at Newcastle to denounce the Church of Rome". Until 1849, the north aisle was separate from the church, as it was the presbytery. Until 1864, the south aisle was also separate and was a school. In 1886, restoration work on the church was carried out and a sacristy was built.

Parish
Holy Trinity Church is in the same parish as Sacred Heart Church in Silverdale. Holy Trinity Church has two Sunday Masses at 5:15pm on Saturday and at 11:00am on Sunday. Sacred Heart Church in Silverdale has one Sunday Mass at 9:00am.

Exterior

See also
 Archdiocese of Birmingham

References

External links
 
 

Newcastle-under-Lyme
Roman Catholic churches in Staffordshire
Grade II* listed Roman Catholic churches in England
Grade II* listed churches in Staffordshire
Gothic Revival church buildings in England
Gothic Revival architecture in Staffordshire
19th-century Roman Catholic church buildings in the United Kingdom
1833 establishments in England
Roman Catholic churches completed in 1834
Religious organizations established in 1833